Amelia Biagioni (1916, Gálvez, Santa Fe – 2000, Buenos Aires) was an Argentine poet. She published six books of poetry between 1954 and 1995.

Work 

 Sonata de Soledad (1954)
 La Llave (1957)
 El Humo (1967)
 Las Cacerias (1976)
 Estaciones de Van Gogh (1984)
 Región de Fuegas (1995)

Her posthumous poem, "Episodios de un viaje venidero", was published in La Nación newspaper days after her death.

References

Partial bibliography
Sonata de soledad. Santa Fe, Argentina: Castellví S.A., 1954.
La Llave. Buenos Aires, Argentina: Emecé, 1957.
The Hunts. Grand Terrace, CA: Xenos Books, 2003,  .

1916 births
2000 deaths
Argentine women poets
People from San Jerónimo Department
20th-century Argentine poets
20th-century Argentine women writers
20th-century Argentine writers